Mostafa Fawzy (born 5 October 1999) is an Egyptian professional footballer who plays as a forward for El Dakhleya on loan from Al Ahly.

Personal life
Fawzy is the brother of fellow professional footballer Mohamed Fawzy.

Career statistics

Club

Notes

References

1999 births
Living people
Egyptian footballers
Association football forwards
Czech National Football League players
Al Ahly SC players
FK Viktoria Žižkov players